Florian Loshaj (born 13 August 1996) is a Kosovo professional footballer who plays as a midfielder for Turkish club İstanbulspor and the Kosovo national team.

Club career

Early career
Loshaj finished his youth career at Belgium club Genk in the summer of 2016. On 1 February 2016, he moved to Dutch Eerste Divisie side MVV Maastricht. On 11 April 2016, Loshaj made his debut for Maastricht in a league match against Fortuna Sittard, after coming on as a substitute in the 90th minute, in place of Jordy Croux.

Politehnica Iași
On 23 June 2019, Loshaj joined Liga I side Politehnica Iași, on a three-year contract. On 13 July 2019, he made his debut against CFR Cluj after being named in the starting line-up and scored his side's only goal during a 1–1 away draw.

Cracovia
On 15 January 2020, Loshaj joined Ekstraklasa side Cracovia, on a three-year contract. On 7 February 2020, he made his debut in a 1–0 away win against Arka Gdynia after being named in the starting line-up.

International career

Under-21
On 29 August 2017, Loshaj received a call-up from Kosovo U21 for a 2019 UEFA European Under-21 Championship qualification matches against Norway U21 and Germany U21 On 1 September 2017, he made his debut with Kosovo U21 in a 2019 UEFA European Under-21 Championship qualification against Norway U21 after coming on as a substitute at 59th minute in place of Kamer Krasniqi.

Senior
On 24 December 2019, Loshaj received a call-up from Kosovo for the friendly match against Sweden and made his debut after being named in the starting line-up.

Personal life
Loshaj was born in Skenderaj, FR Yugoslavia from Kosovo Albanian parents.

Career statistics

Club

International

Honours
Cracovia
Polish Cup: 2019–20

References

External links

1996 births
Living people
Belgian people of Kosovan descent
Sportspeople from Skenderaj
Kosovo Albanians
Kosovan footballers
Belgian footballers
Association football midfielders
Kosovo international footballers
Kosovo under-21 international footballers
Kosovo youth international footballers
MVV Maastricht players
Roda JC Kerkrade players
FC Politehnica Iași (2010) players
MKS Cracovia (football) players
Eerste Divisie players
Liga I players
Ekstraklasa players
III liga players
Kosovan expatriate footballers
Kosovan expatriate sportspeople in the Netherlands
Expatriate footballers in the Netherlands
Expatriate footballers in Poland
Kosovan expatriate sportspeople in Romania
Expatriate footballers in Romania